Elena Borisovna Batanova is a former competitive ice dancer for the Soviet Union. She is a two-time (1980, 1981) World Junior champion with partner Alexei Soloviev. On the senior level, they won the 1982 NHK Trophy and 1984 Soviet national title. They were coached by Lyudmila Pakhomova and later Tatiana Tarasova. Earlier, Batanova competed with Andrei Antonov, with whom she is the 1979 World Junior silver medalist. 

Batanova is the daughter of football player Boris Batanov. She is married to hockey player Igor Larionov, with whom she has two daughters and a son.

Results

With Soloviev

With Antonov

References

Navigation

Russian female ice dancers
Soviet female ice dancers
Living people
World Junior Figure Skating Championships medalists
1964 births
Figure skaters from Moscow